Equal-area may refer to:

 Equal-area map projection
 Equiareal map